Mohamed Hag Ali Hag el Hassan OMRI GCONMC FAAS FIAS FTWAS (born 21 November 1947) is a Sudanese-Italian mathematician and physicist who co-founded numerous scientific councils. He is currently the President of The World Academy of Sciences.

Early life
Hassan was born in Elgetina, Sudan, on the 21st of November 1947.

He obtained a bachelor’s degree (B.Sc.) with special honours from the University of Newcastle Upon Tyne in 1968, followed by an M.Sc in Advanced Mathematics from the University of Oxford in 1969.

He then obtaining his DPhil in Plasma Physics  from the University of Oxford in 1974.

Career
Hassan returned to Sudan later became Professor and Dean of the School of Mathematical Sciences, University of Khartoum from 1985 to 1986. 

Frustrated by scientific stagnation in Sudan, and at the request of his father, Hassan visited Italy, and was then motivated to re-peruse science again by Nobel Prize laureate, Abdus Salam who was (at time) working at the International Centre for Theoretical Physics (ICTP), Trieste. Abdus Salam offered Hassan an associate membership at ICTP to provide a conducive environment for research. 

Hassan has a long list of publications in theoretical plasma physics and fusion energy, environmental modelling of soil erosion in drylands, and geophysics, astrophysics and space physics. He has also published several articles on science and technology in the developing world.

Hassan was the founding Executive Director of the Academy of Science for the Developing World (TWAS) in 1983, President of the African Academy of Sciences in 2000, President of the Network of Academies of Science in Africa (NASAC) in 2001 and Chairman, President of the Sudanese National Academy of Sciences, Director of Secretariat of InterAcademy Partnership (IAP) in 2001, Honorary Presidential Advisory Council for Science and Technology, Nigeria in 2001, and Chair of the Governing Council of the United Nations Technology Bank for the Least Developed Countries. He also is a founding member of the Lebanese Academy of Sciences.

He is a member of several merit-based academies of science, including TWAS, the African Academy of Sciences, Islamic World Academy of Sciences, Academia Colombiana de Ciencias Exactas, Fisicas y Naturales, Académie Royale des Sciences d’Outre-Mer, Pakistan Academy of Sciences; Lebanese Academy of Sciences, Cuban Academy of Sciences, Pontifical Academy of Sciences,  Grand challenges Canada, and Academy of Sciences of South Africa.

Hassan is the co-chair of resident of the InterAcademy Partnership (IAP), and chairman of the Council of the United Nations University (UNU). He also serves on a number of Boards of international organizations worldwide, including the Board of Trustees of Bibliotheca Alexandrina, Egypt, the Council of Science and Technology in Society (STS ) Forum, Japan, the Board of the International Science Programme, Sweden, the Board of the Science Initiative Group (SIG), USA, the International Advisory Board of the Centre for International Development (ZEF), Germany, the advisory group of the Global Young Academy.

Awards and honours 
Hassan is Comendador (1996) and Grand (2005) Cross of the Brazilian National Order of Scientific Merit,  Officer of the Order of Merit of the Italian Republic (2003), and he is the recipient of the G77 Leadership Award and of the Abdus Salam Medal for Science and Technology.

Hassan is a Founding Fellow of the African Academy of Sciences (1985), a Fellow of The World Academy of Sciences (1985), a Fellow of the Islamic World Academy of Sciences (1992), an Honorary Member of the Academia Colombiana de Ciencias Exactas, Fisicas y Naturales (1996), and a Foreign Fellow of the Pakistan Academy of Sciences (2002).

Personal life
Hassan is married with three children.

Selected publications

See also 
 Ahmed Hassan Fahal
 Sultan Hassan
 Nashwa Eassa

References

External links

 

Sudanese mathematicians
Sudanese physicists
1947 births
Living people
Recipients of the Great Cross of the National Order of Scientific Merit (Brazil)
TWAS fellows
Sudanese scientists
Fellows of the African Academy of Sciences
Founder Fellows of the African Academy of Sciences
University of Khartoum alumni
Recipients of the Order of Merit of the Italian Republic
Fellows of the Sudanese National Academy of Sciences